Solenice is a municipality and village in Příbram District in the Central Bohemian Region of the Czech Republic. It has about 400 inhabitants.

Administrative parts
Villages of Dolní Líšnice and Větrov are administrative parts of Solenice.

References

Villages in Příbram District